George and Addison Wheeler House, also known as Old Place, is a historic home located at East Bloomfield in Ontario County, New York. The Greek Revival–style home was built in two sections in about 1818 and 1840.  The 2-story main block from 1840 features a temple front with a massive, pedimented portico. Behind it stands a -story wing that was the original saltbox-style home constructed about 1818.  Also on the property is a 19th-century barn / carriage house and a small family cemetery.  Abandoned for a generation, it was restored in the late 1940s by William and Marie Houghton.

It was listed on the National Register of Historic Places in 2005.

References

Houses on the National Register of Historic Places in New York (state)
Houses completed in 1840
Houses in Ontario County, New York
National Register of Historic Places in Ontario County, New York